Stephen J. Hemsley (born 1952) is chair of the board and former chief executive officer of UnitedHealth Group Inc.

In August 2017, UnitedHealth announced that Hemsley would be stepping down after more than a decade as CEO and starting a newly created role of executive chairman of the board.

Biography

Early life
Stephen J. Hemsley was born in 1952. He graduated from Fordham University in 1974.

Career
He was managing partner and chief financial officer at Arthur Andersen. In 1997, he joined the UnitedHealth Group. He has served as its chief executive officer since 2006.

He was more involved in the handling of backdated stock options than previously revealed, according to documents filed in a 2008 shareholder lawsuit in a Minneapolis District Court.
The company's two investigations largely exonerated him from the backdating scandal. However, the U.S. Securities and Exchange Commission(SEC) continued its investigations even after it in 2008 settled legal actions against both United Health Care itself and its former general counsel.

Compensation 
Business Week reports his annual salary as $14,518,164. For 2016, his compensation was estimated at $31.3 million, representing a 55.8 percent increase compared to 2015, which was estimated at $14,500,000 by FierceHealthcare.

Forbes magazine ranked him at 269th in its 2009 Special Report on CEO Compensation.   According to bizjournals.com the country's highest-paid CEO, Stephen Hemsley, made $101.96 million in 2010. In 2011 he was named the highest paid CEO by Forbes following a large gain in the value of his stock ownership. In late 2011, Hemsley's most recent annual compensation was estimated by Forbes at $48.8 million.

Other positions 
He serves as a trustee of the University of St. Thomas, Minnesota, and as a trustee of Minnesota Public Radio. Additionally, he is a member of the National Executive Board of the Boy Scouts of America, the organization's governing body.

References

American health care chief executives
Living people
1952 births
National Executive Board of the Boy Scouts of America members
American chief financial officers
University of St. Thomas (Minnesota) people
Minnesota Public Radio people
American nonprofit executives
Gabelli School of Business alumni